Heterogeneous nuclear ribonucleoprotein U-like protein 1 is a protein that in humans is encoded by the HNRNPUL1 gene.

This gene encodes a nuclear RNA-binding protein of the heterogeneous nuclear ribonucleoprotein (hnRNP) family. This protein binds specifically to adenovirus E1B-55kDa oncoprotein. It may play an important role in nucleocytoplasmic RNA transport, and its function is modulated by E1B-55kDa in adenovirus-infected cells. HNRPUL1 also participates in ATR protein kinase signalling pathways during adenovirus infection. Two transcript variants encoding different isoforms have been found for this gene. Additional variants have also been found, but their full-length natures have not been determined.

Interactions
HNRPUL1 has been shown to interact with BRD7 and PRMT2.

References

Further reading